Robert Schumann's Fantasiestücke, Op. 12, is a set of eight pieces for piano, written in 1837. The title was inspired by the 1814–15 collection of novellas, essays, treatises, letters, and writings about music, Fantasiestücke in Callots Manier (which also included the complete Kreisleriana, another source of inspiration for Schumann) by one of his favourite authors, E. T. A. Hoffmann. Schumann dedicated the pieces to Fräulein Anna Robena Laidlaw, an accomplished 18-year-old Scottish pianist with whom Schumann had become good friends.

Schumann composed the pieces with the characters Florestan and Eusebius in mind, representing the duality of his personality. Eusebius depicts the dreamer in Schumann while Florestan represents his passionate side. These two characters parlay with one another throughout the collection, ending self-reflectively with Eusebius in "Ende vom Lied".

Details

1. "Des Abends" ("In the Evening") in D major / Sehr innig zu spielen (Play very intimately)

2. "Aufschwung" ("Soaring", literally "Upswing") in F minor / Sehr rasch (Very rapidly)

3. "Warum?" ("Why?") in D major / Langsam und zart (Slowly and tenderly)

4. "Grillen" ("Whims") in D major / Mit Humor (With humor)

5. "In der Nacht" ("In the Night") in F minor / Mit Leidenschaft (With passion)

6. "Fabel" ("Fable") in C major / Langsam (Slowly)

7. "Traumes Wirren" ("Dream's Confusions") in F major / Äußerst lebhaft (Extremely lively)

8. "Ende vom Lied" ("End of the Song") in F major / Mit gutem Humor (With good humor)

See also 

 List of solo piano compositions by Robert Schumann
 Fantasiestücke, Op. 73
 Three Fantasiestücke, Op. 111

References

External links 

 
 Free score at kostenlose-klaviernoten.de
 Notes at Naxos Records
 "Fabel" and "Traumeswirren" from Fantasiestücke played by Arthur Rubinstein at Internet Archive (Open Source Movies)
 , Martha Argerich
 , Seong-Jin Cho

Adaptations of works by E. T. A. Hoffmann
Piano music by Robert Schumann
Compositions for solo piano
1837 compositions
Schumann
Music dedicated to ensembles or performers